is a women's volleyball team based in Kariya city, Aichi, Japan. It plays in V.League Division 1. The club was founded in 1951.
The owner of the team is Toyota Auto Body.

Queenseis is a coined word combining Queen and Seis ("six" in Spanish).

History
It was founded in 1951.
It promoted to V.Challenge League in 1999.
It promoted to V.Premier League in 2006.

Honours
V.Challenge League
Champion(1) - 2005-06
Runner-up(1) - 2004-05
Empress's Cup
Champion (1): 2008
Runner-up (2): 2011, 2018
Champion (1): 2017 
Kurowashiki All Japan Volleyball Tournament
Champion (1): 2014

League results

Current squad

2021-2022 Squad as of 10 September 2021 

 Head coach:  Haruya Indo

Former players

Domestic players

 Eika Oikawa (2004–2008)
 Midori Hane (2002–2011)
 Sakie Takahashi (2011–2014)
 Yumiko Tsuzuki (2006–2012)
 Kaori Tahara (2009–2013)
 Yoshiko Yano (2012–2014)
 Kasumi Takamoto (2012–2014)
 Yukiji Kajiwara (2009–2014)
 Seiko Kawamura (2009–2012) (2013–2014)
 Ayako Sana (2009–2014)
 Yuki Shōji (2013–2015)
 Ikumi Nishibori (2013–2015)
 Mari Yamada (2009–2017)
 Saki Takeda (2011–2018)
 Miyuki Hiramatsu (2010–2018)
 Mio Satō (2014-2019) Transferred to NEC Red Rockets
 Momoko Higane ((2014-2019))
 Saori Takahashi (2014–2020)
 Marina Shichi (2014–2020)
 Nozomi Kanemoto (2016–2020)
 Mami Uchiseto (2018–2020) Transferred to  Saitama Ageo Medics
 Nao Muranaga (2015–2021)
 Aya Watanabe (2017–2021) Transferred to Hitachi Rivale

Foreign players
 
 Polina Rahimova  (2015–2017)
  
 Renata Colombo (2008-2010)
 
 Indre Sorokaite (2020–2021)
 
 Pornpun Guedpard (2020–2021)
  
 Neriman Özsoy (2017–2020)
  
 Jennifer Joines (2007–2008)
 Foluke Akinradewo (2010-2011)
 Lauren Gibbemeyer (2011–2012)
 Kanani Danielson (2012-2015)

References

External links
Queenseis Official Website

Japanese volleyball teams
Volleyball clubs established in 1951
1951 establishments in Japan
Tourist attractions in Aichi Prefecture
Toyota